The FAMU-FSU College of Engineering is the joint college of engineering of Florida A&M University and Florida State University. The College of Engineering was established as a joint program serving two universities in Tallahassee, Florida: The Florida Agricultural and Mechanical University, which received recognition from the National Academy of Sciences and the National Academy of Engineering in 2010 for ranking number one as the institution of origin for African Americans earning Doctorates in Natural Science and Engineering; and, Florida State University which has gained worldwide recognition for its extensive graduate and research programs. The college is located less than three miles from either university.

As of 2014, the school enrolls about 2,584 undergraduates and graduate students, including Master of Science, Master of Engineering, and Ph.D.-seeking students. 2,268 of these students attend FSU and 316 attend FAMU.

The college operates from a  complex of buildings next to Innovation Park in Tallahassee.

All programs are accredited by the Engineering Accreditation Commission of the ABET and the Southern Association of Colleges and Schools (SACS).

History
An engineering school previously existed at Florida State University until the early 1970s, when a downturn in engineering jobs nationally, felt especially in Florida with the downscaling of Project Apollo and the rest of NASA's crewed space program in Central Florida, led to a decision to disestablish the school and relinquish undergraduate and postgraduate engineering education in state universities to the University of Florida, the University of South Florida, and Florida Technological University (later renamed the University of Central Florida) while still maintaining programs in mathematics, chemistry and physics at FSU.

This decision ultimately proved to be short-sighted, and the FAMU–FSU College of Engineering was authorized by the 1982 legislature as a joint program between Florida Agricultural and Mechanical University (FAMU) and Florida State University (FSU). The 122,159 sq. ft. Phase I Building was completed and occupied in 1988. That year, enrollment at the college exceeded 1000. In 1993, the first PhD degree was awarded and enrollment officially passed 2,000. In 1998, the 98,004 sq. ft. Phase II Building was completed and occupied.

Future Phase III expansion 
The 2014–2015 budget passed by the Florida Legislature and signed into law by Governor Rick Scott included $10 million to expand the facilities of the FAMU-FSU College of Engineering.

Phase III construction is set to start and will consist of a new building, renovations to the existing buildings, Buildings A and B and some incidental remodeling in both buildings. Building C will be three stories with a total of +/- 82,500 GSF. The building will tie into the existing complex on all three levels at the Phase II Connector (atrium), the central organizing space of the engineering campus. Building C will house classrooms, teaching labs, research labs, student study area, graduate student offices, auditorium/exhibition hall, food services facility, meeting spaces, student academic support and a new media resource center.

When Phase III is completed, the College of Engineering will occupy over 302,663 GSF of space.

How degrees are awarded
The joint nature of the college allows a student to register at either Florida A&M University or Florida State University and receive a degree in any of the college's programs. A student entering the college applies for admission through one of the two universities and must satisfy the admission and general degree requirements of that university.

The degree a student receives is granted through the College of Engineering only by the university where the student is registered while completing upper-division studies.

Research

The College of Engineering has over $125 million of sponsored research under single and multi-year contracts. The college has annual research expenditures of more than $14 million. The research productivity at the College of Engineering provides opportunities for more than 300 graduate students to conduct their research.

In 2006, the Florida Board of Governors selected FSU's proposal for a Center of Excellence in Advanced Materials and FSU is constructing a  Materials Research Building near the College of Engineering, which will house 13 laboratories for the design, processing and characterization of advanced materials and systems. Several College of Engineering faculty are expected to be housed in this FSU building.

The College of Engineering also operates a Challenger Learning Center in downtown Tallahassee, with a planetarium and IMAX theater. This project was cosponsored by NASA.

Departments, schools, and programs
Department of Chemical & Biomedical Engineering
Department of Civil & Environmental Engineering
Department of Electrical & Computer Engineering
Department of Industrial & Manufacturing Engineering
Department of Mechanical Engineering

Facilities
The College occupies over 220,163 sq. ft. of classroom, office, and laboratory space in a building complex especially designed for engineering education. It is located close to the main campus of each university, in an area adjacent to Innovation Park, which also houses the National High Magnetic Field Laboratory, the Center for Advanced Power Systems (CAPS), the High Performance Materials Institute (HPMI), the Aero-propulsion, Mechatronics and Energy Center (AME) and other university, public and private organizations engaged in research, development, and clean industry operations. Each department of the college operates specialized laboratories for teaching and research. The college operates computing facilities, a library and reading room, as well as machine and electronic shops for the common use of all programs.

Library
The mission of the College of Engineering Library is to support and enhance the learning, teaching, research, and service activities of the FAMU-FSU engineering communities by providing organized access to information in all formats, promoting information literacy, preserving information, and engaging in collaborative partnerships to disseminate ideas to advance intellectual discovery. The main book and journal collections for engineering are housed respectively in both the Dirac Science Library at Florida State University and in the Coleman Library at Florida A&M University. The newly renovated College of Engineering Library is a satellite for both university libraries and houses a small collection along with extensive access to electronic collections. Materials not available at the library may be requested through interlibrary Loan or U-Borrow.

The library is staffed by a full-time librarian and several assistants who offer research assistance in person, over the telephone, and via e-mail and text. Instruction in library and information literacy is available to classes and groups upon request. Library services also include Flip video cameras, laptops, headphones, and other technology that is available for check out upon request. Group study tables, lounging stations, and tutoring areas were all part of the transformation of the engineering library that was completed in May 2011.

Research centers, institutes and labs

 Aero-Propulsion, Mechatronics and Energy Center (AME) at FSU
 Applied Superconductivity Center (ASC) 
Center for Accessibility and Safety for an Aging Population (ASAP)
 Center for Advanced Power Systems (CAPS) at FSU
 Center for Intelligent Systems, Control, and Robotics (CISCOR)
Crashworthiness & Impact Analysis Laboratory (CIAL)
 Center for Nanomagnetics and Biotechnology (CNB)
 Energy Research at College of Engineering
 Energy and Sustainability Center (ESC) at FSU
 Florida Advanced Center for Composite Technologies (FAC2T), which became Florida’s first National Science Foundation Industry/University Cooperative Research Center (I/UCRC)
 Florida Center for Advanced Aero-Propulsion (FCAAP)
 Future Renewable Electric Energy Delivery and Management Systems Center (FREEDM)
 High-Performance Materials Institute (HPMI) at FSU
 Institute for Energy systems, Economics and Sustainability (IESES) at FSU
National High Magnetic Field Laboratory (NHMFL)
 Undergraduate Research Center for Cutting Edge Technologies (URCCET)

National rankings
U.S. News & World Report (2015 edition)

References

External links

Florida State University
Engineering universities and colleges in Florida
1982 establishments in Florida
Florida A&M University
Schools in Tallahassee, Florida